The third season of Monk originally aired in the United States on USA Network from June 18, 2004, to March 4, 2005. It consists of 16 episodes. Tony Shalhoub, Ted Levine, and Jason Gray-Stanford reprise their roles as the main characters, and Traylor Howard joins the cast. Bitty Schram left the show due to a contract dispute during the Winter hiatus. A DVD of the season was released on July 5, 2005.

Crew
Andy Breckman continued his tenure as show runner. Executive producers for the season include Breckman and David Hoberman. NBC Universal Television Studio was the primary production company backing the show. Randy Newman's theme ("It's a Jungle Out There") continued to be used, while Jeff Beal's original instrumental theme can be heard in some episodes. Directors for the season include Randall Zisk, Jerry Levine, Michael Zinberg, and Andrei Belgrader.  Zisk received an Emmy award-nomination for his work on "Mr. Monk Takes His Medicine." Writers for the season included Andy Breckman, David Breckman, Lee Goldberg, William Rabkin, Joe Toplyn, Daniel Dratch, Hy Conrad, and Tom Scharpling.

Cast

Tony Shalhoub returned as the titular character and OCD detective, Adrian Monk. Ted Levine and Jason Gray-Stanford reprised their roles as Captain Leland Stottlemeyer and Lieutenant Randy Disher, respectively. Bitty Schram portrayed Monk's nurse, Sharona Fleming, for the first half of the season, but left due to a contract dispute. Traylor Howard was then cast as Natalie Teeger in a main role as Monk's new assistant. Andy Breckman, the show's creator, stated, "I will always be grateful to Traylor because she came in when the show was in crisis and saved our baby [....] We had to make a hurried replacement, and not every show survives that. I was scared to death."

Guest stars for season three are in even more abundance than the previous two. Stanley Kamel reprised his role as Monk's psychiatrist, Dr. Charles Kroger, in nine episodes, while Kane Ritchotte continued to play Benjy Fleming, Sharona's son. Emmy Clarke entered the series as Julie Teeger (Natalie's daughter), and Melora Hardin returned as Monk's beloved deceased wife, Trudy Monk. Tim Bagley made his first two appearances as Harold Krenshaw, Monk's main rival. Jarrad Paul portrays Kevin Dorfman, Monk's annoying upstairs neighbor, while Glenne Headly continues to portray Karen Stottlemeyer, the captain's wife.

Episodes

Unfilmed episodes
An episode called "Mr. Monk Is at Sea" was written but never filmed for the first half of season 3. The premise was that Monk and Sharona investigate a murder committed on a cruise ship. It was never filmed because no cruise line was willing to loan a ship to the production crew to use for shooting, out of sensitivity to the idea of murders being committed on-board or people falling overboard. This script became considered the series' "white whale" or 126th episode. It only came to light in early 2014, when it was rewritten and published by Hy Conrad as Mr. Monk Gets on Board, which maintains most of the original plot, but substitutes Natalie for Sharona, and adds in a subplot involving a book collector.

Awards and nominations

Emmy Awards
Outstanding Actor – Comedy Series (Tony Shalhoub, won)
Outstanding Directing – Comedy Series (Randall Zisk for "Mr. Monk Takes His Medicine", nominated)

Golden Globe Awards
Best Actor – Musical or Comedy Series (Tony Shalhoub, nominated)

Screen Actors Guild
Outstanding Actor – Comedy Series (Tony Shalhoub, won)

References

Monk (TV series)
2004 American television seasons
2005 American television seasons
Monk (TV series) seasons